Eucalyptus falciformis, commonly known as the Grampians peppermint or western peppermint, is a species of tree or mallee that is endemic to south eastern Australia. It has smooth bark, sometimes with rough, fibrous bark at the base, narrow lance-shaped to egg-shaped or curved adult leaves, flower buds in groups of eleven to twenty one, white flowers and cup-shaped to shortly cylindrical fruit.

Description
It has smooth, pale grey to cream-coloured bark, often with rough, grey, fibrous or plate-like bark at the base. Flowering occurs between September and December and the flowers are white.

Taxonomy and naming
The Grampians peppermint was first formally described in 1986 by M.R. Newnham, Pauline Ladiges and Trevor Whiffin and given the name Eucalyptus willisii subsp. falciformis and the description was published in the Australian Journal of Botany. In 2008, Kevin Rule raised it to species status as E. falciformis. The specific epithet (falciformis) is derived from the Latin word meaning "sickle-shaped", referring to the shape of the juvenile leaves. The earlier epithet (willisii) honours the botanist James Hamlyn Willis.

Distribution and habitat
This eucalypt grows on sandy soils in heathy woodland near the coast in Victoria between Anglesea and the South Australian border and in the Grampians. It also occurs in similar habitats in the far south-east of South Australia near Millicent and Naracoorte.

See also
List of Eucalyptus species

References

Trees of Australia
falciformis
Myrtales of Australia
Flora of Victoria (Australia)
Flora of South Australia
Plants described in 1986